The 1970 Eastern Suburbs season was the 63rd in the club's history. They competed in the NSWRFL's 1970 premiership.

Details

Home Ground:- The Sydney Sports Ground.
Coach:- Don Furner
Captain:- John Brass

Ian Baker, John Ballesty, Cliff Boyd, John Brass, Alan Cardy, John Dykes, Laurie Freier, Graham Gardiner, Kevin Goldspink, Les Hayes, Jim Hall, Mark Harris, Kevin Junee, Johnny Mayes, Allan McKean, Jim Morgan, Peter Moscatt, Bill Mullins, Louis Neumann, John Peard, Jim Porter, Barry Reilley, Ron Saddler

Ladder

Season summary

 Eastern Suburbs won the Club Championship.

References

External links
Rugby League Tables and Statistics

Sydney Roosters seasons
Eastern Suburbs season